Porocimmerites is a genus of beetles in the family Carabidae, containing the following species:

 Porocimmerites angustus Belousov, 1998
 Porocimmerites bisetosus Belousov, 1998
 Porocimmerites circassicus Reitter, 1888
 Porocimmerites dentatus Belousov, 1998
 Porocimmerites imitator Belousov, 1998
 Porocimmerites mirabilis Belousov, 1998
 Porocimmerites politus Belousov, 1998
 Porocimmerites reticulatus Belousov, 1998
 Porocimmerites shakhensis Belousov, 1998
 Porocimmerites ubykh Belousov, 1998

References

Trechinae